The Grand Tour is an album by the American country music artist George Jones, released in 1974 as his fifth album for Epic Records. It peaked at #11 on the Billboard Country Albums chart and contained the hit title track, which reached a peak of #1 in August 1974.

Background
When Jones left Musicor for Epic Records in 1971, he had been on the downswing of a remarkably successful decade when his name was a fixture on the Billboard country singles chart. By the end of the decade, the singer was unhappy with the sloppy production quality of his records and had signed with Epic in the hopes that producer Billy Sherrill could re-establish his music. However, after three albums with Sherrill, Jones still had not scored a solo number one (he had gone to the top of the charts in 1973 with "We're Gonna Hold On", a duet with his then-wife Tammy Wynette). Indeed, Jones had not had a number one song since the ballad "Walk Through This World With Me" in 1967. As Jones biographer Bob Allen details in his book George Jones: The Life and Times of a Honky Tonk Legend, the singer's success paled in comparison to Wynette's, who had scored nine number one hits between 1967 and 1971: "In 1972, Tammy's Greatest Hits LP was certified gold when it sold more than half a million copies – far more than George's albums had ever sold. Everyone could now see that George was running the risk of becoming a mere musical appendage to his younger and ever more famous wife."

That changed when The Grand Tour was released in the summer of 1974, its title track becoming Jones's first number one smash in eight years.  An instant classic, Jones practically inhabits the song, which begins with the irresistible hook, "Step right up, come on in..." The song is widely hailed as one of the finest performances in country music history. In his liner notes for Classic Country Music: A Smithsonian Collection, the genre historian Bill Malone calls it a "perfect matching of lyrics and performance" and "one of the great modern songs of divorce". Throughout the song, the lyrics mix the singer's tour of a home that once held many personal, private and happy memories with foreshadowing to set the final stop on the stroll – to the nursery, where the singer's wife "left me without mercy, taking nothing but our baby and my heart". Malone writes that "the graphic imagery permits the listener to see both the inside of the abandoned home where love has died and the interior of the narrator's mind". As Jones' biographer Bob Allen noted in 1983, the cut was the "Eureka moment" for Billy Sherrill: "After several years of trial and error, Sherrill was also learning how to coax rich, low-register textures out of George's powerful voice and meld them, ever more effectively, with his own heavy-handed 'Sherrillized' production style." In 2006, Jones explained to Billboard, "He just came up with that sound like he got with Tammy, (singing) "Ba bum ba bum ba bum," build-ups...He tried to do that with me, but I finally had a talk with him. I said, 'Billy, I'm country, I'm traditional, I know you're wanting to cross over with me like you have with Tammy, Charlie Rich and those people, but I'm hardcore and I can't help it. That's what I feel, and I can't do a good job for the label, you or anybody else if I don't feel it myself.'"
  
The album produced one other hit, [Johnny Paycheck]'s "Once You've Had The Best", which went to number 3 on the charts and remained a part of Jones' live show for the remainder of his career. The Grand Tour also includes "Our Private Life", a song Jones wrote with Wynette which takes a swipe at the gossip-mongers in the tabloid press who were hounding them and speculating (quite accurately, as it turned out) that their marriage was crumbling. Ironically, one of the co-writers of "The Grand Tour" was George Richey, who eventually married Wynette.

Reception
The Grand Tour is considered one of Jones's greatest albums. Thom Jurek of AllMusic gives the album a perfect score (5 out of 5) and writes: The Grand Tour was "a watershed for Jones, boasting the title track as one of the most devastating country singles ever issued that came so close to crossing over it was being played on some adult pop stations along with Sinatra, Bennett, Dionne Warwick, and Herb Alpert...Ultimately, this is Jones' country, the kind of country music that is pure yet as sophisticated as Sherrill wanted it to be."  In July 2013, Andrew Meuller of Uncut compared the album to Frank Sinatra's In the Wee Small Hours, calling it "An exultant wallow in heartbreak" with Jones inhabiting songs "like an inmate on suicide watch."

Track listing
"The Grand Tour" (Norro Wilson, George Richey, Carmol Taylor) – 3:06
"Darlin'" (Ray Griff) – 2:05
"Pass Me By (If You're Only Passing Through)" (H. B. Hall) – 2:59
"She'll Love the One She's With" (Hank Cochran, Grady Martin) – 2:45
"Once You've Had the Best" (Johnny Paycheck) – 2:40
"The Weatherman" (Norro Wilson, George Richey, Carmol Taylor) – 2:14
"Borrowed Angel" (Mel Street) – 3:04
"She Told Me So" (Bobby Braddock) – 2:54
"Mary Don't Go 'Round" (Earl Montgomery, J. R. Richards) – 2:06
"Who Will I Be Loving Now" (Carmol Taylor, Agnes Wilson) – 2:30
"Our Private Life" (George Jones, Tammy Wynette) – 2:20

External links
George Jones' official website
Epic Record label

1974 albums
George Jones albums
Albums produced by Billy Sherrill
Epic Records albums